Uderzeniowe Bataliony Kadrowe (UBK, English: Striking Cadre Battalions) were armed anti-Nazi resistance units organized by the right-wing Polish organization Konfederacja Narodu. They existed between 1942 and 1944 (after 1943 they were part of the Home Army).

Beginnings 
The idea to create the UBK was conceived among Warsaw’s conspirational circles in early 1940s. Altogether, eight battalions were formed, and their task was to engage the Germans in Polish countryside, especially in the Eastern Borderlands of Poland.

First attempt to organize armed resistance took place in October 1942. Members of the 1st Battalion, under Captain Ignacy Telechun (nom de guerre Toporski), after concentration in the forests north of Warsaw, headed towards northern Podlasie, where they wanted to set a base. However, their forces were not strong enough and after several skirmishes with the Wehrmacht, the unit returned to Warsaw. They lost 36 men - 4 killed, 2 wounded and 30 captured.

Campaigns 
During winter of 1942/43, the UBK carried out preparations for future actions. In January 1943, a patrol under Ryszard Reiff (Jacek) set towards Ciechanowiec, where the 1st Striking Partisan Platoon was created. After some time, the Platoon was renamed into the 8th Battalion.

In late May 1943, UBK, with permission of the headquarters of the Home Army, concentrated its forces (200 men) around Wyszkow. The Germans soon found out about it and surrounded the Poles. A skirmish ensued, in which 4 Poles were killed and 8 wounded. German losses were estimated at 15 killed and 22 wounded. Those who were not caught, divided themselves into two groups and headed north, to Bezirk Bialystok. On June 11, 1943, the UBK forces under Major Stanislaw Pieciul (Radecki) of the 4th Battalion engaged the Germans near the village of Pawly (Bielsk Podlaski County). 25 Poles and approximately 40 Germans died.

In July 1943 the UBK units, active in Bezirk Bialystok, consisted of five Battalions. Altogether, there were 200 fighters, and during a number of skirmishes with the Germans (including the 1943 Polish underground raid on East Prussia), 138 of them were killed. These heavy losses were criticized by the headquarters of the Home Army, who claimed that the UBK was profusely using lives of young Polish soldiers. On August 17, 1943, upon the order of General Tadeusz Bor-Komorowski, the UBK was included into the Home Army. Soon afterwards, all battalions were transferred to the area of Nowogrodek.

During process of reorganization of the Nowogrodek Area of the Home Army, the UBK units created a battalion, which  became part of the 77th Infantry Regiment of the Home Army, under Boleslaw Piasecki. In February 1944 the battalion had around 700 soldiers (some sources put the number at around 500). The unit took part in the Operation Tempest, fighting the Germans around Lida and Wilno (see: Wilno Uprising), where it suffered heavy losses.

Dissolution 
On July 17, 1944, the NKVD officers invited Wilno command of the Home Army for negotiations, arresting them immediately. After this, the former UBK dissolved, and those soldiers who came from Central Poland decided to get back to their homeland.

See also 
 Polish contribution to World War II

References 
 Ze wspomnien zolnierzy AK Okregu Nowogrodek, oprac. Eugeniusz Wawrzyniak, Warszawa 1988.
 Jerzy Slaski, Polska Walczaca, Warszawa 1988. t. V. Uderzenie, s. 616–621.
 Kazimierz Krajewski, Na Ziemi Nowogrodzkiej. "Now" – Nowogrodzki Okreg Armii Krajowej, Warszawa 1997.

Poland in World War II
Military history of Poland during World War II
National radicalism